Roberto Pazzi (born 1946, in Ameglia, Italy) is an Italian novelist and poet. His works have been translated into twenty six languages. 
 
Pazzi graduated in classics in Bologna with a thesis on Luciano Anceschi and aesthetics on the poetry of Umberto Saba. He taught cultural anthropology and the philosophy of history and sociology of art and literature in high school and a college in Ferrara.

His first poems appeared in a poetry anthology in the magazine Arte e poesia in 1970. 
His collections of verse are: L'esperienza anteriore (I dispari, 1973), Versi occidentali (Rebellato 1976), Il re, le parole (Lacaita, 1980), Calma di vento (Garzanti, 1987), Il filo delle bugie (Corbo, 1994), La gravità dei corpi  (Palomar, 1998) and Talismani (Marietti 2003).

He published his first novel Cercando l'Imperatore in 1985. The novel was translated into 12 languages and won the Premio Bergamo. He followed Cercando l'Imperatore with various historic novels: La principessa e il drago (Garzanti 1986), La malattia del tempo (Marietti 1987, Garzanti 1991), Vangelo di Giuda (Garzanti 1989) and La stanza sull'acqua (Garzanti 1991, Bompiani 2012).

With Le città del dottor Malaguti (Garzanti 1993) he moved his novels to a contemporary setting in the town where the book's narrator lives, Ferrara. After that, he wrote Incerti di viaggio (Longanesi 1996, premio Selezione Campiello, superpremio Penne-Mosca 1996), Domani sarò re (Longanesi 1997), La città volante (Baldini & Castoldi 1999, finalist at Premio Strega, introduced by Dario Fo and Sebastiano Vassalli, reprinted by Frassinelli ), Conclave (Frassinelli 2001, Barbera 2012, premio Scanno, premio Comisso, Superpremio Flaiano, premio Stresa, premio Zerilli Marimò of New York University, premio Rapolano Terme, finalist at premio Viareggio, finalist at premio Bigiaretti, translated in 15 countries, among these Germany, USA, France, and Spain), L'erede (Frassinelli 2002, finalist at premio Viareggio, premio Maria Cristina, translated in German), Il signore degli occhi (Frassinelli 2004, premio Cala di Volpe), L'ombra del padre (Frassinelli 2005, translated in French, premio Elsa Morante Isola di Procida), Qualcuno mi insegue (Frassinelli 2007), Le forbici di Solingen (Corbo 2007), Dopo primavera (Frassinelli, 2008), and Mi spiacerà morire per non vederti più (Corbo 2010).

Today, after twelve years of exclusive partnership with Corriere della Sera, Pazzi writes for several newspapers including il Resto del Carlino, La Nazione, Il Giorno and The New York Times.

Pazzi lives in Ferrara, where he teaches at the university, holds annual creative writing courses and, for Corbo editore, he leads the series of narrative "L'Isola Bianca". He is an active lecturer in the various countries of the world where his work has spread.

Works

Poetry

L'esperienza anteriore, I Dispari, 1973
Versi occidentali, Rebellato, 1976
Il re, le parole,  Lacaita, 1980
Calma di vento Garzanti, 1987
Il filo delle bugie, Corbo, 1994
La gravità dei corpi, Palomar, 1998
Talismani,  Marietti, 2003

Novels

Cercando l'Imperatore, Marietti, 1985
La principessa e il drago, Garzanti, 1986
La malattia del tempo, Marietti, 1987
Vangelo di Giuda, Garzanti, 1989
La stanza sull'acqua, Garzanti, 1991
Le città del dottor Malaguti, Garzanti, 1993
Incerti di viaggio, Longanesi, 1996
Domani sarò Re, Longanesi, 1997
La città volante, Baldini e Castoldi, 1999
Conclave, Frassinelli, 2001
L'erede, Frassinelli, 2002
 AA.VV, Dal grande fiume al mare, Pendragon, 2003, pp. 320;
Il signore degli occhi, Frassinelli, 2004
L'ombra del padre, Frassinelli, 2005
Qualcuno mi insegue, Frassinelli, 2007
Le forbici di Solingen, Corbo, 2007
Dopo primavera, Frassinelli, 2008
Mi spiacerà morire per non vederti più, Corbo, 2010

Awards
 Selezione Campiello Prize (1985)
 Bergamo Prize (1985)
 Hemingway Prize (1985)
 Maria Cristina Prize (1986)
 Lerici Pea Prize (1986)
 Piombino Prize (1986)
 Eugenio Montale Prize (1987)
 Rhegium Julii Prize 1987
 Super Grinzane Cavour Prize (1990)
 Castiglioncello Prize (1993)
 Del tascabile Prize (1994)
 Valsassina Prize (1994)
 Selezione Campiello Prize (1996)
 Penne Prize (1996)
 Calliope Prize (1998)
 Frascati Prize (1998)
 Miscia Lanciano Prize (2000)
 Zerilli-Marimò Prize for Italian Fiction (2001) for Conclave
 Flaiano Prize (2001)
 Scanno Prize (2001)
 Comisso Prize (2001)
 Stresa Prize 2001
 Rapolano Terme Prize (2001)
 Maria Cristina Prize (2004)
 Recanati Prize (2006)
 Procida Elsa Morante Prize (2006)
 Scalea Prize (2007)
 Bigiaretti Prize (2007)
 Giorgio La Pira Prize (2008)

References

External links

1) Review of "Searching the Emperor" in The New York Times:
2) "Interview with Roberto Pazzi" in Forum Italicum: 

3) Pazzi's poems translated in English, French, and Spanish: 

4) "Why the next Pope needs to be Italian", article on The New York Times

5) , video on the power of Beauty, in Italian

1946 births
Living people
20th-century Italian novelists
20th-century Italian male writers
21st-century Italian novelists
21st-century Italian male writers
Sociologists of art